Oisy-le-Verger is a commune in the Pas-de-Calais department in the Hauts-de-France region of France.

Geography

Population

Places of interest
 The church of St. Didier, dating from the twentieth century.
 Traces of an old castle and watermill.
 Remains of the Cistercian abbey founded in 1227.
 A pre-Roman menhir.
 The museum, housed in the mairie (town hall).

See also
Communes of the Pas-de-Calais department

References

Oisyleverger